Karl-Erik "Cacka" Andersson (16 January 1927 — 16 August 2005) was a Swedish footballer, bandy player and ice hockey player. He made 174 Allsvenskan appearances for Djurgårdens IF and scored three goals. He was also part of Sweden's squad at the 1952 Summer Olympics, but he did not play in any matches.

Honours
Djurgårdens IF
 Division 2 Nordöstra: 1948–49
 Allsvenskan: 1954–55

References

1927 births
2005 deaths
Association football defenders
Swedish footballers
Sweden international footballers
Swedish ice hockey players
Swedish bandy players
Allsvenskan players
Djurgårdens IF Fotboll players
Djurgårdens IF Hockey players
Djurgårdens IF Bandy players
Footballers at the 1952 Summer Olympics
Olympic footballers of Sweden
Olympic bronze medalists for Sweden
Olympic medalists in football
Medalists at the 1952 Summer Olympics